The massacre of (or at) Mullaghmast refers to a summary execution of Irish gentry by the English Army and Tudor officials in Ireland. It may have occurred at the end of the year 1577 or beginning of 1578. There is limited surviving documentation on the massacre, although documents have recently been made available at the National Library of Ireland.

Background
According to traditional accounts, Francis Cosby (a soldier), and Robert Hartpole – prospective English colonists in the plantation of the Queen's County (the ancient kingdom of Loígis, modern County Laois) and the King's County (the ancient kingdom of Uí Failghe, modern County Offaly) – plotted to kill native Irish chieftains. The Lord Deputy of Ireland, Henry Sidney, reputedly colluded with Cosby and Hartpole. To expedite the plot, they befriended members of prominent native Irish families (including two powerful chieftains from Ulster).

Between 100 and 400 members of families prominent in Loígis and Uí Failghe were summoned to Mullaghmast in County Kildare, under a pretext of performing military service. Most of those who attended were murdered, including some who were burned at the stake.

The following account of the massacre is found in the Annals of the Four Masters:

 1577. A horrible and abominable act of treachery was committed by the English of Leinster and Meath upon that part of the people of Offaly and Leix that remained in confederacy with them, and under their protection. It was effected thus: they were all summoned to shew themselves, with the greatest number they could be able to bring with them, at the great ráth of Mullach-Maistean; and on their arrival at that place they were surrounded on every side by four lines of soldiers and cavalry, who proceeded to shoot and slaughter them without mercy, so that not a single individual escaped, by flight or force.

See also
List of massacres in Ireland
Dempsey

References

External links
 Massacre at Mullaghmast and the Battle of Glenmalure

History of County Kildare
Massacres in Ireland
1578 in Ireland
People executed under Elizabeth I as Queen of Ireland
Massacres in 1577
Massacres in 1578
1577 in Ireland